

C02A Antiadrenergic agents, centrally acting

C02AA Rauvolfia alkaloids
C02AA01 Rescinnamine
C02AA02 Reserpine
C02AA03 Combinations of rauwolfia alkaloids
C02AA04 Rauwolfia alkaloids, whole root
C02AA05 Deserpidine
C02AA06 Methoserpidine
C02AA07 Bietaserpine
C02AA52 Reserpine, combinations
C02AA53 Combinations of rauwolfia alkaloids, combinations
C02AA57 Bietaserpine, combinations

C02AB Methyldopa
C02AB01 Methyldopa (levorotatory)
C02AB02 Methyldopa (racemic)

C02AC Imidazoline receptor agonists
C02AC01 Clonidine
C02AC02 Guanfacine
C02AC04 Tolonidine
C02AC05 Moxonidine
C02AC06 Rilmenidine

C02B Antiadrenergic agents, ganglion-blocking

C02BA Sulfonium derivatives
C02BA01 Trimetaphan

C02BB Secondary and tertiary amines
C02BB01 Mecamylamine

C02BC Bisquaternary ammonium compounds

C02C Antiadrenergic agents, peripherally acting

C02CA Alpha-adrenoreceptor antagonists
C02CA01 Prazosin
C02CA02 Indoramin
C02CA03 Trimazosin
C02CA04 Doxazosin
C02CA06 Urapidil

C02CC Guanidine derivatives
C02CC01 Betanidine
C02CC02 Guanethidine
C02CC03 Guanoxan
C02CC04 Debrisoquine
C02CC05 Guanoclor
C02CC06 Guanazodine
C02CC07 Guanoxabenz

C02D Arteriolar smooth muscle, agents acting on

C02DA Thiazide derivatives
C02DA01 Diazoxide

C02DB Hydrazinophthalazine derivatives
C02DB01 Dihydralazine
C02DB02 Hydralazine
C02DB03 Endralazine
C02DB04 Cadralazine

C02DC Pyrimidine derivatives
C02DC01 Minoxidil

C02DD Nitroferricyanide derivatives
C02DD01 Nitroprusside

C02DG Guanidine derivatives
C02DG01 Pinacidil

C02K Other antihypertensives

C02KA Alkaloids, excluding rauwolfia
C02KA01 Veratrum

C02KB Tyrosine hydroxylase inhibitors
C02KB01 Metirosine

C02KC MAO inhibitors
C02KC01 Pargyline

C02KD Serotonin antagonists
C02KD01 Ketanserin

C02KX Antihypertensives for pulmonary arterial hypertension
C02KX01 Bosentan
C02KX02 Ambrisentan
C02KX03 Sitaxentan
C02KX04 Macitentan
C02KX05 Riociguat
C02KX52 Ambrisentan and tadalafil
C02KX54 Macitentan and tadalafil

C02L Antihypertensives and diuretics in combination

C02LA Rauwolfia alkaloids and diuretics in combination
C02LA01 Reserpine and diuretics
C02LA02 Rescinnamine and diuretics
C02LA03 Deserpidine and diuretics
C02LA04 Methoserpidine and diuretics
C02LA07 Bietaserpine and diuretics
C02LA08 Rauwolfia alkaloids, whole root and diuretics
C02LA09 Syrosingopine and diuretics
C02LA50 Combinations of rauwolfia alkaloids and diuretics including other combinations
C02LA51 Reserpine and diuretics, combinations with other drugs
C02LA52 Rescinnamine and diuretics, combinations with other drugs
C02LA71 Reserpine and diuretics, combinations with psycholeptics

C02LB Methyldopa and diuretics in combination
C02LB01 Methyldopa (levorotatory) and diuretics

C02LC Imidazoline receptor agonists in combination with diuretics
C02LC01 Clonidine and diuretics
C02LC05 Moxonidine and diuretics
C02LC51 Clonidine and diuretics, combinations with other drugs

C02LE Alpha-adrenoreceptor antagonists and diuretics
C02LE01 Prazosin and diuretics

C02LF Guanidine derivatives and diuretics
C02LF01 Guanethidine and diuretics

C02LG Hydrazinophthalazine derivatives and diuretics
C02LG01 Dihydralazine and diuretics
C02LG02 Hydralazine and diuretics
C02LG03 Picodralazine and diuretics
C02LG51 Dihydralazine and diuretics, combinations with other drugs
C02LG73 Picodralazine and diuretics, combinations with psycholeptics

C02LK Alkaloids, excluding rauwolfia, in combination with diuretics
C02LK01 Veratrum and diuretics

C02LL MAO inhibitors and diuretics
C02LL01 Pargyline and diuretics

C02LN Serotonin antagonists and diuretics

C02LX Other antihypertensives and diuretics
C02LX01 Pinacidil and diuretics

C02N Combinations of antihypertensives in ATC-group C02

Empty group

References

C02